Nguyễn Qúy An (born January 18, 1943) is a former Major in the Republic of Vietnam Air Force who risked his life to rescue four Americans in a downed chopper while he was on a different mission. For his actions he was awarded the United States Distinguished Flying Cross and Silver Star. In a subsequent combat mission he lost both of his arms when his helicopter was shot down during a combat mission.

In 1962 An graduated from high school in Saigon. He served as a helicopter pilot in the Republic of Vietnam Air Force from 1963 to 1974, and received some of his training at Fort Rucker, Alabama and Fort Wolters, Texas. He flew numerous combat missions in support of American and South Vietnamese troops in Vietnam. He made three attempts to escape Vietnam, but was apprehended each time and imprisoned.

Distinguished Flying Cross citation
On June 14, 1969, he was awarded the U.S. Distinguished Flying Cross for `Heroism while participating in aerial flight'.

Political asylum granted by the United States

The United States passed special laws designed to help South Vietnamese who had experienced special hardship during the war to immigrate to the United States.  One provision of this law is that those South Vietnamese who spent a year or more in North Vietnamese "re-education camps" were allowed to enter the United States by special provision. However, because of his amputated arms, Major An was released from such a camp after only nine weeks, and so did not qualify.  What he had done for his American comrades-in-arm was completely ignored and only after a staggering amount of paperwork and the special efforts of a U.S Congressman did Major An receive permission to immigrate to the United States.

After a special law was enacted, Major An was granted legal residency and citizenship on October 31, 1996. However, this special consideration did not apply to his daughter, Nguyen Ngoc Kim Quy, who takes care of him, and additional efforts had to be made before she was able to come to the United States.

He now lives in San Jose.

See also
Nguyen Van Kiet - Petty Officer Third Class in the Republic of Vietnam Navy recipient of the Navy Cross.
Tran Van Bay, Army of the Republic of Vietnam - Private First Class Tran was posthumously awarded the Navy Cross for heroism after he sacrificed his life to save a U.S. Marine on February 19, 1967.

References

External links
Senate lets former South Vietnamese major who saved 4 Americans remain in U.S (Photo of Major Nguyen)
King helped Vietnamese rescuer remain in U.S.
THE VIETNAM WAR VETERANS

1943 births
South Vietnam Air Force personnel
Military personnel from California
People from San Jose, California
Recipients of the Distinguished Flying Cross (United States)
Living people
Shot-down aviators
Vietnamese emigrants to the United States
South Vietnamese military personnel of the Vietnam War
Recipients of the Silver Star
Helicopter pilots
 American amputees
 Vietnamese amputees